, also known as Yokoku Castle, Aoyagi Castle, and Ukitsu Castle, is a castle located in Hiji, Ōita Prefecture, Japan. The construction of the castle began in 1601, under Kinoshita Nobutoshi's orders, when he was transferred to Hiji from Himeji. The castle was designed by  Nobutoshi's brother-in-law, Hosokawa Tadaoki. It holds a strategic location, as it overlooks Beppu Bay. Today, the castle's ruins (all that remains are the stone walls and the Sumi yagura) are a park, though Hiji Elementary School is also located on the grounds.

References 

Castles in Ōita Prefecture